Takeshi Miyanaga  is a Japanese mixed martial artist. He competed in the Bantamweight division.

Mixed martial arts record

|-
| Win
| align=center| 2-0-2
| Jun Kanetaka
| Submission (heel hook)
| Shooto - Shooto
| 
| align=center| 1
| align=center| 2:23
| Tokyo, Japan
| 
|-
| Win
| align=center| 1-0-2
| Mamoru Okochi
| Decision (unanimous)
| Shooto - Shooto
| 
| align=center| 3
| align=center| 3:00
| Tokyo, Japan
| 
|-
| Draw
| align=center| 0-0-2
| Kenji Ogusu
| Draw
| Shooto - Shooto
| 
| align=center| 3
| align=center| 3:00
| Tokyo, Japan
| 
|-
| Draw
| align=center| 0-0-1
| Satoshi Fukuoka
| Draw
| Shooto - Shooto
| 
| align=center| 3
| align=center| 3:00
| Tokyo, Japan
|

See also
List of male mixed martial artists

References

External links
 
 Takeshi Miyanaga at mixedmartialarts.com
 Takeshi Miyanaga at fightmatrix.com

Japanese male mixed martial artists
Bantamweight mixed martial artists
Living people
Year of birth missing (living people)